Gene Glazer may refer to:

Gene Glazer (fencer) (born 1939), American Olympic competitor in 1960 and 1964
Gene Glazer (actor) (born 1942), American performer; also credited as Eugene Robert Glazer